The 2016–17 daytime network television schedule for four of the five major English-language commercial broadcast networks in the United States covers the weekday daytime hours from September 2016 to August 2017. The schedule is followed by a list per network of returning series, and any series canceled after the 2015–16 season.

Affiliates fill time periods not occupied by network programs with local or syndicated programming. PBS – which offers daytime programming through a children's program block, PBS Kids – is not included, as its member television stations have local flexibility over most of their schedules and broadcast times for network shows may vary. Also not included are stations affiliated with Fox (as the network does not air a daytime network schedule or network news), MyNetworkTV (as the programming service also does not offer daytime programs of any kind), and Ion Television (as its schedule is composed mainly of syndicated reruns).

Legend

 New series are highlighted in bold.

Schedule
 All times correspond to U.S. Eastern and Pacific Time scheduling (except for some live sports or events). Except where affiliates slot certain programs outside their network-dictated timeslots, subtract one hour for Central, Mountain, Alaska, and Hawaii-Aleutian times.
 Local schedules may differ, as affiliates have the option to pre-empt or delay network programs. Such scheduling may be limited to preemptions caused by local or national breaking news or weather coverage (which may force stations to tape delay certain programs in overnight timeslots or defer them to a co-operated station or digital subchannel in their regular timeslot) and any major sports events scheduled to air in a weekday timeslot (mainly during major holidays). Stations may air shows at other times at their preference.

Monday-Friday

Notes:
 CBS owned-and-operated and affiliate stations have the option of airing Let's Make a Deal at either 10:00 a.m. or 3:00 p.m. Eastern, depending on the station's choice of feed.
 (†) Today aired its last edition as a standard four-hour broadcast on September 22, 2017. Afterwards, it was split into three structurally differing programs with the fourth hour turning into Kathie Lee & Hoda.

Saturday

 On September 30, 2017, The CW returned the 7:00 a.m. and 11:00 a.m. hours to its owned-and-operated stations and affiliates.

Sunday

By network

ABC

Returning series:
ABC World News Tonight
The Chew
General Hospital
Good Morning America
The View

CBS

Returning series:
The Bold and the Beautiful
CBS Evening News
CBS This Morning
Let's Make a Deal
The Price is Right
The Talk
The Young and the Restless
CBS Dream Team
Lucky Dog
The Henry Ford Innovation Nation with Mo Rocca
Chicken Soup for the Soul's Hidden Heroes
The Inspectors
Dr. Chris: Pet Vet

Not returning from 2015–16:
CBS Dream Team
Game Changers with Kevin Frazier

The CW

New series:
The Robert Irvine Show
One Magnificent MorningRescue Me with Dr. LisaDinner SpinnerUnlikely Animal FriendsVacation CreationSave to WinReturning series:One Magnificent MorningDog Whisperer: Family EditionCalling Dr. PolSave Our ShelterNot returning from 2015–16:The Bill Cunningham ShowOne Magnificent MorningDog Town, USADream QuestHatchedNBC

Returning series:Days of Our LivesNBC Nightly NewsTodayNew series:The More You KnowThe Voyager with Josh GarciaThe Champion Within with Lauren ThompsonGiveWilderness Vet with Dr. OakleyJourney with Dylan DreyerNaturally, Danny SeoNot returning from 2015–16
NBC Kids (continues on Sprout and Telemundo)Astroblast!Noodle and DoodleThe Chica ShowClangersNina's WorldEarth to Luna!FloogalsLazyTownRuff-Ruff, Tweet and DaveTerrific TrucksTree Fu Tom''

See also
2016–17 United States network television schedule (prime-time)
2016–17 United States network television schedule (late night)

References

Sources
 
 
 

United States weekday network television schedules
2016 in American television
2017 in American television